Raman Stsyapanaw (born 6 August 1991) is a Belarusian professional footballer who plays for Kyzylzhar.

Honours
Torpedo-BelAZ Zhodino
Belarusian Cup winner: 2015–16

Shakhtyor Soligorsk
Belarusian Premier League champion: 2022

References

External links
 
 

1991 births
Living people
People from Smalyavichy
Sportspeople from Minsk Region
Belarusian footballers
Association football goalkeepers
Belarusian expatriate footballers
Expatriate footballers in Kazakhstan
FC BATE Borisov players
FC Torpedo-BelAZ Zhodino players
FC Rudziensk players
FC Naftan Novopolotsk players
FC Smolevichi players
FC Torpedo Minsk players
FC Rukh Brest players
FC Dynamo Brest players
FC Shakhtyor Soligorsk players
FC Kyzylzhar players